Matthäus Seutter (20 September 1678 Augsburg – March 1757 in Augsburg) was a German map publisher of the 18th century.

Biography
Seutter started his career as an apprentice brewer. Apparently uninspired by the beer business, Seutter left his apprenticeship and moved to Nuremberg where he apprenticed as an engraver under the tutelage of the prominent J. B. Homann. Sometime in the early 18th century Seutter left Homann to establish his own independent cartographic publishing firm in Augsburg. Though he struggled in the early years of his independence, Seutter’s engraving skill and commitment to diversified map production eventually gained him a substantial following. Most of Seutter’s maps were heavily based upon, if not copies of, earlier work done by the Homann and Delisle firms.

By 1732 Seutter was honored by the German Emperor Charles VI with the title of “Imperial Geographer”. Seutter continued to publish until his death, at the height of his career, in 1757.
The Seutter firm continued under Seutter’s son Albrecht Carl until his death in 1762. Following Albrecht’s death, the firm was divided between the established Probst firm and the emerging firm of Tobias Conrad Lotter. 
Lotter, Matthäus Seutter’s son in law, was a master engraver and worked on behalf of the Seutter firm. Lotter would eventually become one of the most prominent cartographers of his day.

References

Sources 
Ritter, M. Seutter, Probst and Lotter: An Eighteenth-Century Map Publishing House in Germany., "Imago Mundi", Vol. 53, (2001), pp. 130–135.)

1647 births
1756 deaths
German cartographers
Map publishing companies
People from Augsburg